Joshna Fernando (born 12 November 1991) is an Indian actress and model who has appeared in Tamil films.

Career
Born in a Tamil family to former actress Saroja, who appeared in K. Balachander's Maro Charitra (1978) and Vaali's Vadamalai (1982), Joshna expressed that she was keen to appear in Tamil films from her childhood. Her father, Stanley Fernando, was the brother of M. R. Radha's wife and hence Joshna is a cousin to Raadhika and Nirosha. Joshna made her acting debut, aged four, in  Radhika Sarathkumar's tele-film Siragugal (1999), portraying the daughter of Vikram's character.

In 2008, she made a return to Tamil films and began working on Marupadiyum Oru Kadhal (2012) appearing as Maheswari, a London-born medical student. Joshna was selected after the film makers wanted to cast an actress from London, and she subsequently worked on the film in London and Chennai. The film had a delayed release opened in 2012 to negative reviews, with a critic noting the lead pair "do look like they have the potential to shine in a better story". She also subsequently worked on an action film titled Kai, which opened to negative reviews in late 2012. Another project she was working on, Rasu Madhuravan's Parthom Pazhaginom opposite actor Mayilsamy's son Anbu, was shelved soon after launch. In 2013, she took part in the beauty pageant, Miss Sri Lanka.

Joshna was brought in to feature in the action film Irumbu Kuthirai (2014) in November 2013, after actress Lakshmi Rai had walked out of the project, and Joshna subsequently shot for some sequences and a song with the cast in a schedule in Italy. However, in a turn of events in early 2014, Lakshmi Rai rejoined the project and Joshna's scenes in the particular role were edited out of the film. One scene featuring Joshna was used in the film, and was edited to make her appear as Lakshmi Rai's sister, who shows off several different superbikes to Adharvaa's and Priya Anand's characters in a warehouse. She later worked on another low budget film titled Manam Nilluna Nikkadhadi, which was completed but failed to have a theatrical release.

Filmography

References

Indian film actresses
Actresses in Tamil cinema
Living people
1991 births
Actresses from Chennai
21st-century Indian actresses
Child actresses in Tamil cinema
Indian child actresses